Kartar Singh Bhadana is an Indian politician and is a member of the Bahujan Samaj Party political party.

Family
His father was Nahar Singh and his mother was Ramphali Devi. Avtar Singh Bhadana is his brother.

Political career
Kartar Singh Bhadana has been a MLA for three terms. For two terms he served the Samalkha Vidhan Sabha Haryana and also as a cooperative minister of Haryana. For one term, he served the Khatauli (Assembly constituency) in Uttar Pradesh. 

In 1999, Bhadana played a vital role in the formation of INLD government in the state of Haryana. He was the president of HVP(D) (the breakaway group of 18 MLAs of the Haryana Vikas Party) and supported Om Prakash Chautala as the next chief minister and he became heavyweight cabinet minister in the government.

In 2007, he strongly raised the demand of Gurjar community over the issue of gurjar reservation also known as "The Gurjar Andolan". He took the pledge to not eat a single grain ( अन्न in Hindi) until the government releases all the people put in jail over the issue of andolan and ate only fruits and liquids for approx. 7 months until his demands were fulfilled.

Posts held

See also
Government of India
Politics of India

References 

1955 births
Living people
Rashtriya Lok Dal politicians
People from Muzaffarnagar district
Haryana MLAs 1996–2000
Uttar Pradesh MLAs 2012–2017
Bahujan Samaj Party politicians
Haryana Vikas Party politicians
Bharatiya Janata Party politicians from Uttar Pradesh
Haryana MLAs 2000–2005